Insulasaurus is a genus of skinks. They are all endemic to the Philippines.

Species
The following four species, listed alphabetically by specific name, are recognized as being valid:

Nota bene: A binomial authority in parentheses indicates that the species was originally described in a genus other than Insulasaurus.

References

 
Lizard genera
Endemic fauna of the Philippines
Taxa named by Edward Harrison Taylor
Taxa described in 1925